The Chindawol uprising was an insurrection that took place on June 23, 1979 in the Chindawol district in the old city of Kabul, Afghanistan. The rebellion was caused by the arrests of scholars and influential fighters of the city's Shia communities (Hazaras and Qizilbashs) by the ruling Khalq-PDPA government. Chindawol was predominantly populated by these communities. The protests started when residents attacked and held a police station that day, marching on the streets and on Joda-i Maiwand whilst shouting religious and anti-government slogans. Several thousands took part. The government brutally cracked down on them in a four-hour battle and around 2,000 Hazaras were arrested and executed.

It was the first popular uprising of 1979 that occurred in Kabul.

See also 
 Chindawol
 Bala Hissar uprising
 3 Hut uprising

References 

Military history of Afghanistan
1979 in Afghanistan
Conflicts in 1979
Cold War rebellions
June 1979 events in Asia
Rebellions in Afghanistan